The Yelloway-Pioneer System (sometimes styled YellowaY-Pioneer) was a group of independently-owned intercity bus companies that operated the first transcontinental bus route in the United States.

Proposed in early 1927, the first transcontinental bus trip took place in 1928.  The initial route ran from Los Angeles, California to Philadelphia, Pennsylvania. In September 1928, the route was extended from Philadelphia to New York City.  The first Los Angeles to New York City trip was completed on 11 September 1928, covered 3,433 highway miles, and took 5 days and 14 hours to travel.

Also in 1928, the American Motor Transportation Company purchased most of the YellowaY member firms.

In February 1929, the Motor Transit Corporation (which became Greyhound Corporation later that year) bought the Yelloway-Pioneer System for $6.4 m million.

References

Further reading
Hixson, Kenneth (2001).  Pick of the Litter.  Lexington: Centerville Book Company.  .
Jackson, Carlton (1984).  Hounds of the Road.  Dubuque: Kendall Hunt Publishing Company.  .
Meier, Albert, and John Hoschek (1975).  Over the Road.  Upper Montclair, NJ (US): Motor Bus Society.  No ISBN.
Schisgall, Oscar (1985).  The Greyhound Story.  Chicago: J.G. Ferguson Publishing Company.  .
Motor Coach Age (a publication of the Motor Bus Society), various issues, especially these:
July–August 1990;
March–April 1991;
April–June 1995;
October–December 1996;
October–December 1998.
Backfire, the corporate newspaper for the Southeastern Greyhound Lines, all issues, from January 1938 through February 1956.

Bus transportation in the United States
Intercity bus companies of the United States
American companies established in 1927
Transport companies established in 1927